The following is a list of Malayalam films released in 1969.

1969
Malayalam
 1969
1969 in Indian cinema